The 1958 All-Ireland Senior Camogie Championship Final was the 27th All-Ireland Final and the deciding match of the 1958 All-Ireland Senior Camogie Championship, an inter-county camogie tournament for the top teams in Ireland.

The game was played after the - hurling semi-final (hence the high attendance figure). Dublin had a comfortable victory.

References

All-Ireland Senior Camogie Championship Final
All-Ireland Senior Camogie Championship Final
All-Ireland Senior Camogie Championship Final, 1958
All-Ireland Senior Camogie Championship Finals
Dublin county camogie team matches
Tipperary county camogie team matches